The Christian-Social People's Party, often shortened to People's Party (VP), was a social liberal political party in Liechtenstein. Founded in 1918, the Christian-Social People's Party and the Progressive Citizens' Party (FBP) were the first political parties in Liechtenstein.

History
The party was established in 1918 as an offshoot of the trade union movement. It first formed the country's government following the 1922 elections, and remained in power until losing the 1928 elections.

In 1936, it merged with Liechtenstein Homeland Service (LHD) to form the Patriotic Union (VU).

Electoral performance

Ideology
The VP advocated for an expansion of democracy and progressive social policies, and was also supportive of the country's constitutional monarchy. Due to its pro-democratic social liberal leanings and party colors, party members were often referred to disparagingly as "Reds."

References 

Defunct Christian political parties
Catholic political parties
Defunct political parties in Liechtenstein
Political parties established in 1918
Political parties disestablished in 1936
1918 establishments in Liechtenstein
1936 disestablishments in Liechtenstein